William Kennedy (January 1, 1841 – November 19, 1910) was an American politician and lawyer.

Born in County Limerick, Ireland, Kennedy moved to Whitewater, Wisconsin and then Janesville, Wisconsin. In 1871, he settled in Appleton, Wisconsin. He served as District Attorney of Outagamie County, Wisconsin. Then from 1885 until 1894, Kennedy served in the Wisconsin State Senate as a Democrat. He was committed to Northern State Hospital for the Insane on Asylum Bay north of Oshkosh in 1907, where he died in 1910.

Notes

1841 births
1910 deaths
Politicians from Appleton, Wisconsin
Irish emigrants to the United States (before 1923)
Wisconsin lawyers
County officials in Wisconsin
Democratic Party Wisconsin state senators
19th-century American politicians
19th-century American lawyers